Radisson station is a Montreal Metro station in the borough of Mercier–Hochelaga-Maisonneuve in Montreal, Quebec, Canada. It is operated by the Société de transport de Montréal (STM) and serves the Green Line. It is in the district of Saint-Jean-de-Dieu. It opened on June 6, 1976, as part of the extension of the Green Line to Honoré-Beaugrand station.

Overview 
Designed by Papineau, Gérin-Lajoie, Le Blanc, Edwards, it is a normal side platform station built partly in tunnel, with a very tall, vaulted volume over the eastern part of the platform. This contains the transept and a tall escalator shaft rising unsupported to the ticket hall above. The latter gives access to three entrances. The station serves a metropolitan bus terminus and a park and ride lot.

Origin of the name
The station is named for rue Radisson. Pierre-Esprit Radisson (c. 1640–1710) was a French explorer who was instrumental in the development of the Hudson's Bay Company.

Nearby points of interest
 Place Versailles
 Institut universitaire en santé mentale de Montréal
 Lucie Bruneau Rehabilitation Centre
 Provigo
 Royal Versailles Hotel
 Galeries d'Anjou (with bus 44 north)
 Louis-Hippolyte Lafontaine Bridge–Tunnel

Film and television appearances
Scenes of the Bruce Willis-Richard Gere film The Jackal were shot in this station, redressed to stand in for the Capitol Heights station on the Washington Metro.

Terminus Radisson

The adjoining bus terminus, located on the west side of Sherbrooke Street, is owned and operated by the Réseau de transport métropolitain, with all bus traffic entering and leaving through the rear at Faradon Street. Several regional MRC de L'Assomption and MRC Les Moulins routes of the CRT Lanaudière use the terminus, as well as Société de transport de Laval and Réseau de transport de Longueuil buses, and local services provided by Société de transport de Montréal. It is the only terminus where STL and RTL bus routes meet.

On December 13, 2021, as part of mitigation measures related to major repairs of the nearby Louis-Hippolyte Lafontaine Bridge–Tunnel undertaken by the Quebec government, three new Exo buses as well as one new RTL bus connecting the bus terminus to the south shore were added. The announcement was made by Transport Minister and Minister Responsible for the Montreal Region, Chantal Rouleau, and Justice Minister, Attorney General, and Minister Responsible for the Montérégie region, Simon Jolin-Barrette. New bus quays would be added to the terminus as well. The new buses connect Montreal to Boucherville, Varennes, Sainte-Julie and Beloeil. The Exo buses to the South Shore operate on weekdays and holidays only, with reduced service being offered on holidays.

Connecting bus routes

See also 
 ARTM park and ride lots

References

External links

 Radisson Station — official site
 Montreal by Metro, metrodemontreal.com - photos and information
 STM 2011 System map
 Metro Map
 STL Schedules
 STL 2011 map 

Green Line (Montreal Metro)
Exo bus stations
Brutalist architecture in Canada
Mercier–Hochelaga-Maisonneuve
Railway stations in Canada opened in 1976
1976 establishments in Quebec